10th National Board of Review Awards
December 15, 1938
The 10th National Board of Review Awards were announced on 15 December 1938.

Best American Films
The Citadel
Snow White and the Seven Dwarfs
The Beachcomber
To the Victor
Sing You Sinners
The Edge of the World
Of Human Hearts
Jezebel
South Riding
Three Comrades

Top Foreign Films 
Grand Illusion
Ballerina
Un carnet de bal
La Guerre des boutons
Peter the First
Professor Mamlock

Winners
Best American Film: The Citadel
Best Foreign Film: La grande illusion (Grand Illusion), France
Best Acting:
Lew Ayres - Holiday
Pierre Blanchar, Harry Baur, Louis Jouvet, Raimu - Un carnet de bal
James Cagney - Angels with Dirty Faces
Joseph Calleia - Algiers
Chico - Adventures of Chico
Robert Donat - The Citadel
Will Fyffe - To the Victor
Pierre Fresnay, Jean Gabin, Dita Parlo, Erich von Stroheim - Grand Illusion
John Garfield - Four Daughters
Wendy Hiller - Pygmalion
Charles Laughton, Elsa Lanchester - The Beachcomber
Robert Morley - Marie Antoinette
Ralph Richardson - South Riding / The Citadel
Margaret Sullavan - Three Comrades
Spencer Tracy - Boys Town

Notes

External links
National Board of Review of Motion Pictures :: Awards for 1938

1938
1938 film awards
1938 in American cinema